Frank C. Crampsey (born 3 May 1932) is a Scottish retired amateur football goalkeeper who made over 110 appearances in the Scottish League for Queen's Park.

Personal life 
Crampsey's older brother, Bob, was a football historian, author and broadcaster.

Honours 
Queen's Park
 Scottish League Second Division: 1955–56

References 

Scottish footballers
Scottish Football League players
Association football goalkeepers
Queen's Park F.C. players
Living people
Footballers from Glasgow
1932 births
Arbroath F.C. players
Ashfield F.C. players
Falkirk F.C. players
Scotland amateur international footballers